London is a city in Pope County, Arkansas, United States. The population was 1,039 at the 2010 census. It is part of the Russellville Micropolitan Statistical Area.

Geography
London is located at  (35.325802, -93.236557).

Demographics

2020 census

As of the 2020 United States census, there were 936 people, 307 households, and 185 families residing in the city.

2000 census
As of the census of 2000, there were 925 people, 359 households, and 268 families residing in the city. The racial makeup of the city was 96.6% White, 0.3% Black or African American, 1.41% Native American, 0.22% Asian, and 1.41% from two or more races.  1.0% of the population were Hispanic or Latino of any race.

There were 359 households, out of which 10.0% had children under the age of 1 living with them, 59.9% were married couples living together, 11.1% had a female householder with no husband present, and 25.1% were non-families. 20.6% of all households were made up of individuals, and 8.9% had someone living alone who was 65 years of age or older.  The average household size was 2.58 and the average family size was 2.97.

In the city, the population was spread out, with 26.4% under the age of 18, 9.2% from 18 to 24, 29.1% from 25 to 44, 22.4% from 45 to 64, and 13.0% who were 65 years of age or older.  The median age was 36 years. For every 100 females, there were 91.9 males.  For every 100 females age 18 and over, there were 98.5 males.

The median income for a household in the city was $30,804, and the median income for a family was $36,172. Males had a median income of $28,036 versus $17,391 for females. The per capita income for the city was $14,815.  About 8.0% of families and 13.6% of the population were below the poverty line, including 20.8% of those under age 18 and 15.5% of those age 65 or over.

History
London was renamed from Haddoxburg by the first postmaster. The reason is unknown.

  London used to have its own high school.  Grades 10-12 moved to Russellville in the early 1950s, and grades 7-9 moved to Russellville in 1965. Currently the London School consists of grades K-through-4.

Notable people
Trevor Drown - Republican member of the Arkansas House of Representatives for Pope and Van Buren counties since 2015; former London resident
Brooks Hays - Deceased member of the United States House of Representatives for Arkansas's 5th congressional district, since disbanded, and briefly president of the Southern Baptist Convention.

Points of interest
London to Paris TSD Rally This is a "Time Speed Distance" (a race of time not speed) rally that is held annually on the last Saturday in October. The rally starts at the London Town Hall then runs into the Ozark National Forest north of London, ending in downtown Paris with a dinner and trophies awarded.
 Polk Salad Festival

References

Cities in Arkansas
Cities in Pope County, Arkansas
Russellville, Arkansas micropolitan area
Arkansas populated places on the Arkansas River